"Mama" is a song recorded by Italian balladeer Umberto Tozzi and American pop star Laura Branigan. Renowned throughout Italy, Tozzi's melodic and romantic music was largely unheard outside his native country until Branigan discovered his songs and gave them dramatic reinterpretations.

Originally written by Tozzi and Giancarlo Bigazzi in the late 1970s, "Mama" was one of several Italian songs Laura Branigan recorded in the early- to mid-1980s with a bold, urgently emotional vocal and more dynamic instrumentation that sharpened the songs' hooks and captured the zeitgeist of the era's synth- and guitar-driven Europop style. In 1982, the 1979 Tozzi/Bigazzi tune "Gloria" became a platinum, Number One smash for Branigan and launched her career. Two years later, Branigan would take the 1977 Tozzi/Bigazzi song "Ti Amo" to the top of the charts in several countries. And Bigazzi was the co-writer of Branigan's biggest international hit, "Self Control" (the only one of the four written in English and recorded by Branigan as written). For "Mama," as for "Ti Amo," Branigan's English lyrics were written by Diane Warren, a frequent collaborator on Branigan's early albums. Featured on her 1983 album, Branigan 2, "Mama" is the only one of the four which Branigan didn't release as a single.

1970s songs
Laura Branigan songs
Songs about mothers
Songs written by Diane Warren
Songs written by Giancarlo Bigazzi
Songs written by Umberto Tozzi
Umberto Tozzi songs
it:Eva/Mama